Stanisław Gąsienica Daniel (born March 6, 1951 in Zakopane) is a Polish former ski jumper who competed during the early 1970s. He won a bronze medal in the individual large hill at the 1970 FIS Nordic World Ski Championships in Vysoké Tatry which was also his best finish in his short career.

References
 

Polish male ski jumpers
Olympic ski jumpers of Poland
Ski jumpers at the 1972 Winter Olympics
Sportspeople from Zakopane
Living people
1951 births
FIS Nordic World Ski Championships medalists in ski jumping
20th-century Polish people